The White House in Bastrop, Texas, is a one-story Late Victorian cottage built in c.1890.  It was listed on the National Register of Historic Places in 1978.

It was listed as part of a study of historic resources in the Bastrop area which listed a number of sites to the National Register.

See also

National Register of Historic Places listings in Bastrop County, Texas
Recorded Texas Historic Landmarks in Bastrop County

References

National Register of Historic Places in Bastrop County, Texas
Houses on the National Register of Historic Places in Texas
Houses completed in 1890
Houses in Bastrop County, Texas
Recorded Texas Historic Landmarks